Khojir (also Romanized as Khojīr and Ḩajīr) is a village in Saidabad Rural District, in the Jajrud District of Pardis County, Tehran Province, Iran. At the 2006 census, its population was 579, with 159 families. Khojir has given its name to Khojir National Park, which lies between Road 79 (Iran) and Road 44 (Iran).

Missile production complex 

Khojir houses a missile production complex, which is closely linked with the military facility at Parchin. The installation at Khojir produces both liquid propellant and solid propellant. The "vast" Khojir complex is owned by the Shahid Hemmat Industrial Group.

In late June 2020, a blast at the facility lit up the night sky in Tehran. The main buildings at the missile production centre appeared undamaged.

References 

Populated places in Pardis County